Arabesque is a form of artistic decoration consisting of plant tendrils, leaves and flowers, very common in Islamic art. It may also refer to:

Ballet 

 Arabesque (ballet position)

Music

Genres and compositions 
 Arabesque (classical music)
 Arabesques (Debussy), two piano pieces by Claude Debussy
 Arabeske (Schumann), a piano piece by Robert Schumann
 Arabesque (Turkish music)

Artists
 Arabesque (group), a 1970s Euro disco group
 Arabesque (rapper) (born 1981), Canadian hip hop artist
 Arabesque, a British band formed by Keith Girdler and Paul Stewart of Blueboy

Albums
 Arabesque (Sibel Can album), 2016
 Arabesque: Geçmiş, Geçmemiş Hiç..., a 2010 album by Işın Karaca
 Arabesque / Misteriosa Venezia, a 1986 album by Rondò Veneziano
Arabesque, album by John Klemmer 1977

Songs 
 "Arabesque", single by 999 (band) 1984
 "Arabesque", by Ahmad Jamal from Crystal, 1987
 "Arabesque", a concert band piece composed by Samuel Hazo, 2008
 "Arabesque", by Nightwish from Imaginaerum, 2011
 "Arabesque", by Cheap Trick from Bang, Zoom, Crazy... Hello, 2016
 "Arabesque", by Coldplay, 2019
 "Arabesque", by Avantasia from A Paranormal Evening with the Moonflower Society, 2022

Labels 
 Arabesque Records, classical and jazz music label

Television and film 

 Arabesque, a 1966 thriller feature film
 Arabesque TV, a TV channel
 Arabesque, French title for Murder, She Wrote TV show

Other uses 
 Arabesque (company), a Romanian building materials company
 Arabesque, a collar patch insignia used by German speaking countries’ armed forces, see Kragenspiegel
 Arabesque Partners, an Anglo-German responsible investment management firm
 Arabesque, a manga by Ryoko Yamagishi
 Arabesque Software, producer of Ecco Pro

See also 

 Arabesk (disambiguation)